Henri Étiévant (13 March 1870 – 9 August 1953) was a French actor and film director.

Born Henri Gaston Étiévan-Estival in Paris, he died in 1953 in the 11th arrondissement of Paris.

Selected filmography
 The Lady of Lebanon (1926)
 Siren of the Tropics (1927) featuring Josephine Baker making her the first ever African-American woman to star in a major motion production.

1870 births
1953 deaths
French male stage actors
French film directors
French male film actors
French male silent film actors
Silent film directors
Male actors from Paris
20th-century French male actors